Jerome Martin "Jerry" Haynes (January 31, 1927 – September 26, 2011) was an American actor from Dallas, Texas. He is most well known as Mr. Peppermint, a role he played for 30 years as the host of one of the longest-running local children's shows in television, the Dallas-based  Mr. Peppermint (1961–1969), which was retitled Peppermint Place for its second run (1975–1996). He also had a long career in local and regional theater and appeared in more than 50 films. A 1944 graduate of Dallas' Woodrow Wilson High School, he was the father of Butthole Surfers frontman Gibby Haynes.

Early life
He was born in Dallas, Texas to Louise Schimmelpfennig Haynes and Fred Haynes. In 1990, Haynes was inducted into Woodrow Wilson High School's Hall of Fame. Jerry graduated from Southern Methodist University after attending Louisiana State University and Yale.

Family
Jerry was father of vocalist Gibby Haynes of The Butthole Surfers, and his brother was Major General Fred E. Haynes Jr., USMC.

Acting career

The "Mr. Peppermint" years
Haynes began his most famous role in 1961, playing a character who wore a red- and white-striped jacket and straw hat and carried a candy-striped magic cane. The original show ran for nine years as a live show on WFAA-TV (Channel 8, the ABC affiliate in Dallas owned by the parent company of the Dallas Morning News), with Mr. Peppermint talking with a variety of puppet characters and including everything from cartoons to French lessons.

Early in the run of his show, an accident of fate made Haynes the first to report the Kennedy assassination on local news, together with his WFAA program director, Jay Watson. During lunch on the day of the shooting, the two men watched the Presidential motorcade pass on Main Street, and less than a minute later heard the deadly shots after the limousine turned onto Elm Street. The men quickly located and interviewed eyewitnesses, going on the air shortly later:

During these early years, Mr. Peppermint began at 7:30 AM and ran for one hour, competing in its last half-hour with the national CBS broadcast of Captain Kangaroo but usually winning its time slot. National trends shifted, however, and in 1970, the show was replaced by a talk program for the adult audience. Haynes moved back to the Channel 8 news team, reporting on sports (as he did for a few years in the 1950s before the Mr. Peppermint assignment) alongside sports director Verne Lundquist (later of CBS Sports fame); included among the sports legends Haynes interviewed (in much the same "subdued and respectful manner" as his Mr. Peppermint persona) were Joe Namath, Merlin Olsen, Hayden Fry, the then-head football coach of Southern Methodist University, Dallas Cowboys head coach Tom Landry and their then-star quarterback Roger Staubach. Haynes reported on the Cowboys' home of Texas Stadium as it neared completion and prepared for its inaugural season in 1971.

After the Federal Communications Commission called in 1975 for more educational programming for children, Haynes donned the candy-striped suit again, this time for a retooled Peppermint Place, a taped half-hour kids' magazine-style program, still originating from the WFAA studios. The show continued in that format for over 20 years, eventually being syndicated to 108 markets nationwide before ending its run in 1996.

Other television and film work

Most of Haynes' film career was in made-for-television films, especially those set in his native Texas. His first film role was in the 1981 docudrama Crisis at Central High, about the integration of Little Rock's Central High School, filmed in Dallas. Texas-themed films in which he has appeared — mostly based on true stories — include Houston: The Legend of Texas (1986), A Killing in a Small Town (1990, aka Evidence of Love), Bonnie & Clyde: The True Story (1992), Texas Justice (1995), Don't Look Back (1996), and It's in the Water (1997).

His chief feature film roles included 1984's Places in the Heart, as Deputy Jack Driscoll, and in the 1985 Patsy Cline biopic Sweet Dreams as Owen Bradley, Cline's record producer. He also played minor roles in RoboCop (1987) and Boys Don't Cry (1999).

He also appeared as himself, partly through archive footage, in four documentary films discussing the Kennedy assassination: Rush to Judgment (1967), 11-22-63: The Day the Nation Cried (1989), Stalking the President: A History of American Assassins (1992), and Image of an Assassination: A New Look at the Zapruder Film (1998).

In 1996 the Lone Star Film & Television Awards honored him with a Lifetime Achievement Award. He regularly appeared in the Red River, New Mexico, Fourth of July parade in a candy-striped Jeep.

Health
Haynes was diagnosed with Parkinson's disease in early 2008, and then was later diagnosed with a heart condition for which he received an artificial pacemaker.  His doctors later revised their opinions to determine that he had a less aggressive form of Parkinson's. Haynes died on September 26, 2011, from complications due to the diseases.  He was 84.

Partial filmography
Places in the Heart (1984) - Deputy Jack Driscoll
Sweet Dreams (1985) - Owen Bradley
Papa Was a Preacher (1985) - Jack Murphy
RoboCop (1987) - Dr. McNamara
Heartbreak Hotel (1988) - Mr. Hansen
Hard Promises (1991) - Walt's Dad
Steele's Law (1991) - Ben Slade
Bonnie & Clyde: The True Story (1992) - Arvin
My Boyfriend's Back (1993) - Minister At Funeral
Walker Texas Ranger (1993-2001) - Hank Sweet \ Judge Abe Stiegler 
The Stars Fell on Henrietta (1995) - George (farmer #2)
It's in the Water (1997) - Mr. Adams
The Locusts (1997) - Harlan
Possums (1998) - Bob
The Outfitters (1999) - Father John
Abilene (1999) - Pete
Boys Don't Cry (1999) - Judge
The Keyman (2002) - Canman
Balls Out: Gary the Tennis Coach (2009) - Stringerman (final film role)

References

External links
 
 Jerry Haynes footage, including Mr. Peppermint reels, in the Southern Methodist University Jones Film Archive
 
  (includes interview content)

1927 births
2011 deaths
Male actors from Texas
American male film actors
American male television actors
Neurological disease deaths in Texas
Deaths from Parkinson's disease
People from Dallas
Witnesses to the assassination of John F. Kennedy